Laugh at the Bank is an annual weekend comedy festival founded in 2009 by Féile an Phobail in Belfast, Northern Ireland. The festival runs over the Spring Bank Holiday in May and features comedians from around the world. The festival also features charitable events such as Bull Runs.

History

In December 2008, Féile an Phobail, an arts organisation which runs four – five festivals a year, traditionally based in west Belfast, began planning the first dedicated weekend comedy festival in the city. The first festival was featured highly in the media in publications such as Hot Press and Irish national newspapers.

Line-up

2009
Laugh at the Bank ran from 22–24 May 2009. The line-up and events included:

 PJ Gallagher
 Kevin McAleer
 Sean Hughes
 Willa White
 Bull Run (in aid of CLIC Sargent Northern Ireland)

2010
Laugh at the Bank ran from 27–30 May 2010. The line-up and events included:

 Paul Tonkinson
 Karl Spain
 Neil Delamere
 Bernard O'Shea
 Matt Reed
 Aidan Bishop
 Gemma Hutton
 Laugh 4 Haiti (featuring over 30 comedians in aid of victims of the 2010 Haiti earthquake)

External links 
Official website

References

Comedy festivals in Northern Ireland
Festivals in Belfast